Qaracallı (also, Karadzhally and Karadzhaly) is a village and municipality in the Ujar Rayon of Azerbaijan.  It has a population of 3292.

References 

Populated places in Ujar District